Rebound is an anthology television series which aired on both the ABC and on the DuMont networks. Featuring dramatic stories with unusual endings, the series ran from February 8, 1952, to May 30, 1952, on ABC (17 episodes) and from November 21, 1952, to January 16, 1953, on DuMont (5 episodes). The ABC series aired Fridays from 9 to 9:30pm ET.

The DuMont series aired Fridays from 8:30 to 9pm ET, alternating weekly with Dark of Night. Among the actors appearing were Onslow Stevens, Lee Marvin, John Doucette, and Rita Johnson.

The show was the TV debut of Lee Marvin. The series was known as Counterpoint in syndication from 1955 to 1956.

Production 
The show was produced on film by Bing Crosby Enterprises, with Basil Grillo as executive producer and Harve Foster as general manager. Bernard Girard was the producer and director. It originated from WABD-TV.

Episodes
Episodes included "Dry, with Three Olives", starring Hans Conried, on November 14, 1952. One episode is listed on the website TV4U. Two episodes are held in the J. Fred MacDonald collection at the Library of Congress. Episodes are also held (under the Counterpoint title) by the UCLA Film and Television Archive.

November 21, 1952 - "The Good Turn" - George Macready, Rita Johnson, Hayden Roarke, Jeanne Dean, Charles Watts

See also
 List of programs broadcast by the DuMont Television Network
 List of surviving DuMont Television Network broadcasts

Bibliography
 David Weinstein, The Forgotten Network: DuMont and the Birth of American Television (Philadelphia: Temple University Press, 2004) 
 Alex McNeil, Total Television, Fourth edition (New York: Penguin Books, 1980) 
 Tim Brooks and Earle Marsh, The Complete Directory to Prime Time Network TV Shows, Third edition (New York: Ballantine Books, 1964)

References

External links
 
 Episode list at CTVA
 DuMont historical website

DuMont Television Network original programming
American Broadcasting Company original programming
1950s American anthology television series
1952 American television series debuts
1953 American television series endings
1950s American drama television series
Black-and-white American television shows
English-language television shows